Lena Mary Calhoun Horne (June 30, 1917 – May 9, 2010) was an American dancer, actress, singer, and civil rights activist. Horne's career spanned more than seventy years, appearing in film, television, and theatre. Horne joined the chorus of the Cotton Club at the age of sixteen and became a nightclub performer before moving to Hollywood.

Horne advocated for human rights and took part in the March on Washington in August 1963. Later she returned to her roots as a nightclub performer and continued to work on television while releasing well-received record albums. She announced her retirement in March 1980, but the next year starred in a one-woman show, Lena Horne: The Lady and Her Music, which ran for more than 300 performances on Broadway. She then toured the country in the show, earning numerous awards and accolades. Horne continued recording and performing sporadically into the 1990s, retreating from the public eye in 2000.

Early life 
Lena Horne was born in Bedford–Stuyvesant, Brooklyn. Both sides of her family were African American. She belonged to the well-educated, upper stratum of black New Yorkers at the time.

Her father, Edwin Fletcher "Teddy" Horne Jr. (1893–1970), a one-time owner of a hotel and restaurant, was a gambler—he and his partner, the gambler and philanthropist Gus Greenlee, owned the Belmont Hotel on Wylie Avenue and ran the numbers racket in the Hill" – who left the family when Lena was three years old and moved to an upper-middle-class African-American community in the Hill District community of Pittsburgh, Pennsylvania, where Lena came to live with him aged 18 until her marriage the next year. Her mother, Edna Louise Scottron, was an actress with a black theatre troupe and traveled extensively. Edna's maternal grandmother, Amelie Louise Ashton, was from modern Senegal. Horne was raised mainly by her grandparents, Cora Calhoun and Edwin Horne.

When Horne was five, she was sent to live in Georgia. For several years, she traveled with her mother. From 1927 to 1929, she lived with her uncle, Frank S. Horne. He was the Dean of students at Fort Valley Junior Industrial Institute (now part of Fort Valley State University) in Fort Valley, Georgia, who later served as an adviser to President Franklin Delano Roosevelt. From Fort Valley, southwest of Macon, Horne briefly moved to Atlanta with her mother; they returned to New York when Horne was twelve years old, after which Horne attended St Peter Claver School in Brooklyn.

She then attended Girls High School, an all-girls public high school in Brooklyn that has since become Boys and Girls High School; she dropped out without earning a diploma. At the age of 18, she moved to her father's home in Pittsburgh, staying in the city's Little Harlem for almost five years and learning music from native Pittsburghers Billy Strayhorn and Billy Eckstine, among others.

Career

Road to Hollywood 
In the fall of 1933, Horne joined the chorus line of the Cotton Club in New York City. In the spring of 1934, she had a featured role in the Cotton Club Parade starring Adelaide Hall, who took Lena under her wing. Horne made her first screen appearance as a dancer in the musical short Cab Calloway's Jitterbug Party (1935). A few years later, Horne joined Noble Sissle's Orchestra, with which she toured and with whom she made her first records, issued by Decca. After she separated from her first husband, Horne toured with bandleader Charlie Barnet in 1940–41, but disliked the travel and left the band to work at the Cafe Society in New York. She replaced Dinah Shore as the featured vocalist on NBC's popular jazz series The Chamber Music Society of Lower Basin Street. The show's resident maestros, Henry Levine and Paul Laval, recorded with Horne in June 1941 for RCA Victor. Horne left the show after only six months when she was hired by former Cafe Trocadero (Los Angeles) manager Felix Young to perform in a Cotton Club-style revue on the Sunset Strip in Hollywood.

Horne already had two low-budget movies to her credit: a musical feature called The Duke is Tops (1938, later reissued with Horne's name above the title as The Bronze Venus); and a two-reel short subject, Boogie Woogie Dream (1941), featuring pianists Pete Johnson and Albert Ammons. Horne's songs from Boogie Woogie Dream were later released individually as soundies. Horne made her Hollywood nightclub debut at Felix Young's Little Troc on the Sunset Strip in January 1942. A few weeks later, she was signed by Metro-Goldwyn-Mayer. In November 1944, she was featured in an episode of the popular radio series Suspense, as a fictional nightclub singer, with a large speaking role along with her singing. In 1945 and 1946, she sang with Billy Eckstine's Orchestra.

She made her debut at Metro-Goldwyn-Mayer in Panama Hattie (1942) and performed the title song of Stormy Weather (1943) based loosely on the life of Adelaide Hall, for 20th Century Fox, while on loan from MGM. She appeared in several MGM musicals, including Cabin in the Sky (1943) with an entirely African-American cast. She was otherwise not featured in a leading role because of her ethnicity and the fact that her films were required to be re-edited for showing in cities where theaters would not show films with black performers. As a result, most of Horne's film appearances were stand-alone sequences that had no bearing on the rest of the film, so editing caused no disruption to the storyline. One number from Cabin in the Sky was cut before release because it was considered too suggestive by the censors: Horne singing "Ain't It the Truth" while taking a bubble bath. This scene and song are featured in the film That's Entertainment! III (1994), which also featured commentary from Horne on why the scene was deleted prior to the film's release. Horne was the first African-American person elected to serve on the Screen Actors Guild board of directors.

In Ziegfeld Follies (1946), she performed "Love" by Hugh Martin and Ralph Blane. Horne lobbied for the role of Julie LaVerne in MGM's version of Show Boat (1951), having already played the role when a segment of Show Boat was performed in Till the Clouds Roll By, but lost the part to Ava Gardner, a friend in real life. Horne claimed this was due to the Production Code's ban on interracial relationships in films, although MGM sources state she was never considered for the role. In the documentary That's Entertainment! III, Horne stated that MGM executives required Gardner to practice her singing using Horne's recordings, which offended both actresses. Ultimately, Gardner's voice was overdubbed by actress Annette Warren (Smith) for the theatrical release.

Changes of direction 
Horne became disenchanted with Hollywood and increasingly focused on her nightclub career. She made only two major appearances for MGM during the 1950s: Duchess of Idaho (1950, which was also Eleanor Powell's final film); and the musical Meet Me in Las Vegas (1956). She said she was "tired of being typecast as a Negro who stands against a pillar singing a song. I did that 20 times too often." She was blacklisted during the 1950s for her affiliations in the 1940s with communist-backed groups. She would subsequently disavow communism. She returned to the screen, playing Claire Quintana, a madam in a brothel who marries Richard Widmark, in the film Death of a Gunfighter (1969), her first straight dramatic role with no reference to her color. She later appeared on screen two more times as Glinda in The Wiz (1978), which was directed by her then son-in-law Sidney Lumet, and co-hosting the MGM retrospective That's Entertainment! III (1994), in which she related her unkind treatment by the studio.

After leaving Hollywood, Horne established herself as one of the premier nightclub performers of the post-war era. She headlined at clubs and hotels throughout the U.S., Canada, and Europe, including the Sands Hotel in Las Vegas, the Cocoanut Grove in Los Angeles, and the Waldorf-Astoria in New York. In 1957, a live album entitled, Lena Horne at the Waldorf-Astoria, became the biggest-selling record by a female artist in the history of the RCA Victor label at that time. In 1958, Horne became the first African-American woman to be nominated for a Tony Award for "Best Actress in a Musical", for her part in the "Calypso" musical Jamaica (which, at Horne's request featured her longtime friend Adelaide Hall).

From the late 1950s through to the 1960s, Horne was a staple of TV variety shows, appearing multiple times on Perry Como's Kraft Music Hall, The Ed Sullivan Show, The Dean Martin Show, and The Bell Telephone Hour. Other programs she appeared on included The Judy Garland Show, The Hollywood Palace, and The Andy Williams Show. Besides two television specials for the BBC (later syndicated in the U.S.), Horne starred in her own U.S. television special in 1969, Monsanto Night Presents Lena Horne. During this decade, the artist Pete Hawley painted her portrait for RCA Victor, capturing the mood of her performance style.

In 1970, she co-starred with Harry Belafonte in the hour-long Harry & Lena special for ABC; in 1973, she co-starred with Tony Bennett in Tony and Lena. Horne and Bennett subsequently toured the U.S. and U.K. in a show together. In the 1976 program America Salutes Richard Rodgers, she sang a lengthy medley of Rodgers songs with Peggy Lee and Vic Damone. Horne also made several appearances on The Flip Wilson Show. Additionally, Horne played herself on television programs such as The Muppet Show, Sesame Street, and Sanford and Son in the 1970s, as well as a 1985 performance on The Cosby Show and a 1993 appearance on A Different World. In the summer of 1980, Horne, 63 years old and intent on retiring from show business, embarked on a two-month series of benefit concerts sponsored by the sorority Delta Sigma Theta. These concerts were represented as Horne's farewell tour, yet her retirement lasted less than a year.

On April 13, 1980, Horne, Luciano Pavarotti, and host Gene Kelly were all scheduled to appear at a Gala performance at the Metropolitan Opera House to salute the NY City Center's Joffrey Ballet Company. However, Pavarotti's plane was diverted over the Atlantic and he was unable to appear. James Nederlander was an invited Honored Guest and observed that only three people at the sold-out Metropolitan Opera House asked for their money back. He asked to be introduced to Horne following her performance. In May 1981, The Nederlander Organization, Michael Frazier, and Fred Walker went on to book Horne for a four-week engagement at the newly named Nederlander Theatre on West 41st Street in New York City. The show was an instant success and was extended to a full year run, garnering Horne a special Tony award, and two Grammy Awards for the cast recording of her show Lena Horne: The Lady and Her Music. The 333-performance Broadway run closed on Horne's 65th birthday, June 30, 1982. Later that same week, she performed the entire show again to record it for television broadcast and home video release. Horne began a tour a few days later at Tanglewood (Massachusetts) during the weekend of July 4, 1982. The Lady and Her Music toured 41 cities in the U.S. and Canada until June 17, 1984. It played in London for a month in August and ended its run in Stockholm, Sweden, September 14, 1984. In 1981, she received a Special Tony Award for the show, which also played to acclaim at the Adelphi Theatre in London in 1984. Despite the show's considerable success (Horne still holds the record for the longest-running solo performance in Broadway history), she did not capitalize on the renewed interest in her career by undertaking many new musical projects. A proposed 1983 joint recording project between Horne and Frank Sinatra (to be produced by Quincy Jones) was ultimately abandoned, and her sole studio recording of the decade was 1988's The Men in My Life, featuring duets with Sammy Davis Jr. and Joe Williams. In 1989, she received the Grammy Lifetime Achievement Award.

In 1995, a "live" album capturing Horne's Supper Club performance was released (subsequently winning a Grammy Award for Best Jazz Vocal Album). In 1998, Horne released another studio album, entitled Being Myself. Thereafter, Horne retired from performing and largely retreated from public view, though she did return to the recording studio in 2000 to contribute vocal tracks on Simon Rattle's Classic Ellington album.

Civil rights activism 

Horne was long involved with the Civil Rights Movement. In 1941, she sang at Café Society, New York City's first integrated venue, and worked with Paul Robeson. During World War II, when entertaining the troops for the USO, she refused to perform "for segregated audiences or for groups in which German POWs were seated in front of Black servicemen", according to her Kennedy Center biography. Because the U.S. Army refused to allow integrated audiences, she staged her show for a mixed audience of black U.S. soldiers and white German POWs. Seeing the black soldiers had been forced to sit in the back seats, she walked off the stage to the first row where the black troops were seated and performed with the Germans behind her. However, the USO observed at the time of her death that Horne did in fact tour "extensively with the USO during WWII on the West Coast and in the South". The organization also commemorated her for the appearances she made on Armed Forces Radio Service programs Jubilee, G.I. Journal, and Command Performances. In the film Stormy Weather (1943), Horne's character would perform the film's title song as part of a big, all-star show for World War II soldiers as well. After quitting the USO in 1945, Horne financed tours of military camps herself.

She was at an NAACP rally with Medgar Evers in Jackson, Mississippi, the weekend before Evers was assassinated. She was at the March on Washington and spoke and performed on behalf of the NAACP, S.N.C.C., and the National Council of Negro Women. She also worked with Eleanor Roosevelt in attempts to pass anti-lynching laws. Tom Lehrer mentions her in his song "National Brotherhood Week" in the line "Lena Horne and Sheriff Clark are dancing cheek to cheek" referring (wryly) to her and to Sheriff Jim Clark, of Selma, Alabama, who was responsible for a violent attack on civil rights marchers in 1965. In 1983, the NAACP awarded her the Spingarn Medal.

Horne was a registered Democrat and on November 20, 1963, she, along with Democratic National Committee (D.N.C.) Chairman John Bailey, Carol Lawrence, Richard Adler, Sidney Salomon, Vice-Chairwoman of the DNC Margaret B. Price, and Secretary of the DNC Dorothy Vredenburgh Bush, visited John F. Kennedy at The White House, two days prior to his assassination.

Personal life 

Horne married Louis Jordan Jones, a political operative, in January 1937 in Pittsburgh. On December 21, 1937, their daughter, Gail (later known as Gail Lumet Buckley, a writer) was born.  They had a son, Edwin Jones (1940–1970) who died of kidney disease. Horne and Jones separated in 1940 and divorced in 1944. Horne's second marriage was to Lennie Hayton, who was music director and one of the premier musical conductors and arrangers at MGM, in December 1947 in Paris. They separated in the early 1960s, but never divorced. He died in 1971. In her as-told-to autobiography Lena by Richard Schickel, Horne recounts the enormous pressures she and her husband faced as an interracial couple. She later admitted in an interview in Ebony (May 1980) that she had married Hayton to advance her career and cross the color barrier in show business, but "learned to love him very much".

Horne had affairs with long-time heavyweight champion Joe Louis, musician and actor Artie Shaw, actor Orson Welles, and director Vincente Minnelli.

Horne also had a long and close relationship with Billy Strayhorn, whom she said she would have married if he had been heterosexual. He was also an important professional mentor to her. Screenwriter Jenny Lumet, known for her award-winning screenplay Rachel Getting Married, is Horne's granddaughter, the daughter of filmmaker Sidney Lumet and Horne's daughter Gail. Her other grandchildren include Gail's other daughter, Amy Lumet, and her son's four children, Thomas, William, Samadhi, and Lena. Her great-grandchildren include Jake Cannavale.

Horne was Catholic. From 1946 to 1962, she resided in St. Albans, Queens, New York, enclave of prosperous African Americans, where she counted among her neighbors Count Basie, Ella Fitzgerald, and other jazz luminaries. In the 1980s, she moved into the fifth floor of the Volney, a hotel-turned-co-op, at 23 East 74th Street.

Death 
Horne died of congestive heart failure on May 9, 2010. Her funeral took place at St. Ignatius Loyola Church on Park Avenue in New York, where she had been a member. Thousands gathered and attendees included: Leontyne Price, Dionne Warwick, Liza Minnelli, Jessye Norman, Chita Rivera, Cicely Tyson, Diahann Carroll, Leslie Uggams, Lauren Bacall, Robert Osborne, Audra McDonald, and Vanessa Williams.  Her remains were cremated.

Legacy 
In 2003, ABC announced that Janet Jackson would star as Horne in a television biographical film. In the weeks following Jackson's "wardrobe malfunction" debacle during the 2004 Super Bowl, however, Variety reported that Horne had demanded Jackson be dropped from the project. "ABC executives resisted Horne's demand", according to the Associated Press report, "but Jackson representatives told the trade newspaper that she left willingly after Horne and her daughter, Gail Lumet Buckley, asked that she not take part." Oprah Winfrey stated to Alicia Keys during a 2005 interview on The Oprah Winfrey Show that she might possibly consider producing the biopic herself, casting Keys as Horne.

In January 2005, Blue Note Records, her label for more than a decade, announced that "the finishing touches have been put on a collection of rare and unreleased recordings by the legendary Horne made during her time on Blue Note." Remixed by her long-time producer Rodney Jones, the recordings featured Horne with a remarkably secure voice for a woman of her years, and include versions of such signature songs as "Something to Live For", "Chelsea Bridge", and "Stormy Weather". The album, originally titled Soul but renamed Seasons of a Life, was released on January 24, 2006. In 2007, Horne was portrayed by Leslie Uggams as the older Lena and Nikki Crawford as the younger Lena in the stage musical Stormy Weather staged at the Pasadena Playhouse in California (January to March 2009). In 2011, Horne was also portrayed by actress Ryan Jillian in a one-woman show titled Notes from A Horne staged at the Susan Batson studio in New York City, from November 2011 to February 2012. The 83rd Academy Awards presented a tribute to Horne by actress Halle Berry at the ceremony held February 27, 2011.

In 2018, a forever stamp depicting Horne began to be issued; this made Horne the 41st honoree in the Black Heritage stamp series.

In June 2021, the Prospect Park bandshell in Brooklyn was renamed the Lena Horne Bandshell to honor Horne, a Bed-Stuy Brooklyn native, and to show solidarity with the black community.

The Nederlander Organization announced in June 2022 that Broadway's Brooks Atkinson Theatre would be renamed after her later that year. The theater's marquee was unveiled on November 1, 2022. The theatre is now called the Lena Horne Theatre, which means Horne is the first black woman to have a Broadway theater named after her.

Awards

Grammy Awards 
{| class=wikitable
|+ colspan="4" style="text-align:center;"| Lena Horne Grammy Award History'|- align=center
|  || Lena Horne at the Sands || Best Vocal Performance Album, Female || 
|- align=center
|  || Porgy and Bess || Best Solo Vocal Performance, Female || 
|- align=center
|rowspan="2"|  || Lena Horne: The Lady and Her Music  || Best Pop Vocal Performance, Female  || 
|- align=center
| Lena Horne: The Lady and Her Music || Best Cast Show Album || 
|- align=center
|rowspan="2"|  || The Men in My Life || Best Jazz Vocal Performance  || 
|- align=center
| "I Won't Leave You Again"  || Best Jazz Vocal Performance, Duo or Group || 
|- align=center
|  ||  || Lifetime Achievement Award  || 
|- align=center
|  || An Evening with Lena Horne || Best Jazz Vocal Performance || 
|}

 Other awards 

 Filmography 

 Film 

 Cab Calloway's Jitterbug Party (1935, short subject)
 The Duke Is Tops (1938)
 Panama Hattie (1942)
 Cabin in the Sky (1943)
 Stormy Weather (1943)
 Thousands Cheer (1943)
 I Dood It (1943)
 Swing Fever (1943)
 Boogie-Woogie Dream (1944, short subject filmed in 1941)
 Broadway Rhythm (1944)
 Two Girls and a Sailor (1944)
 Studio Visit (1946) (short subject; featuring outtake from Cabin in the Sky)
 Till the Clouds Roll By (1946)
 Ziegfeld Follies (1946)
 Words and Music (1948)
 Some of the Best (1949, short subject)
 Duchess of Idaho (1950)
 Meet Me in Las Vegas (1956)
 The Heart of Show Business (1957, short subject)
 Now! (1965) (short subject, voice only)
 Death of a Gunfighter (1969)
 The Wiz (1978)
 That's Entertainment! III (1994)
 Strange Frame (archive footage, 2012)

 Television 

 What's My Line? (as Mystery Guest, September 27, 1953)
 Ed Sullivan Show (January 6, 1957)
 "What's My Line?" (as Mystery Guest, March 2, 1958)
 The Judy Garland Show (as herself, October 13, 1963)
 The Perry Como Show (as herself, March 5, 1965)
 Sesame Street (as herself, Episode #5.1, November 19, 1973)
 Sanford & Son ("A Visit from Lena Horne" as herself, #2. January 12, 1973)
 The Muppet Show (as herself, 1976)
 Sesame Street (as herself, Episode #7.76, March 15, 1976)
 The Cosby Show ("Cliff's Birthday" as herself, May 9, 1985)
 A Different World ("A Rock, a River, a Lena" as herself, July 1993)

 Discography 

 Albums 
 Moanin' Low (RCA Victor, 1942)
 Classics in Blue (Black & White, 1947)
 Lena Horne Sings (Tops, 1953)
 It's Love (RCA Victor, 1955)
 Lena Horne (Tops, 1956)
 Jamaica with Ricardo Montalban (RCA Victor, 1957)
 Stormy Weather (RCA Victor, 1957)
 Lena Horne at the Waldorf Astoria (RCA Victor, 1957)
 Lena and Ivie with Ivie Anderson (Jazztone, 1957)
 I Feel So Smoochie (Lion, 1958)
 Give the Lady What She Wants (RCA Victor, 1958)
 Songs by Burke and Van Heusen (RCA Victor, 1959)
 Porgy & Bess with Harry Belafonte (RCA Victor, 1959)
 Lena Horne at the Sands (RCA Victor, 1961)
 L' inimitable Lena Horne with Phil Moore (Explosive, 1962)
 Lena...Lovely and Alive (RCA Victor, 1962)
 Lena on the Blue Side (RCA Victor, 1962)
 Fabulous! (Baronet, 1962)
 Here's Lena Now! (20th Century Fox, 1963)
 Swinging Lena Horne (Coronet, 1963)
 Lena Horne Sings Your Requests (MGM, 1963)
 Lena Like Latin (CRC Charter 1963)
 Gloria Lynne & Lena Horne (Coronet, 1963)
 The Incomparable Lena Horne (Tops, 1963)
 Feelin' Good (United Artists, 1965)
 Merry from Lena (United Artists, 1966)
 Soul (United Artists, 1966)
 Lena in Hollywood (United Artists, 1966)
 The Horne of Plenty (World Record Club 1966)
 Dinah Washington: A Memorial Tribute with Ray Charles, Sarah Vaughan (Coronet, 1967)
 My Name Is Lena (United Artists, 1967)
 Lena & Gabor with Gábor Szabó (Skye, 1970)
 Harry & Lena with Harry Belafonte (RCA, 1970)
 Nature's Baby (Buddah, 1971)
 Lena (Ember, 1971)
 Lena & Michel with Michel Legrand (RCA Victor, 1975)
 Lena: A New Album (RCA, 1976)
 The Exciting Lena Horne (Springboard, 1977)
 Love from Lena (Koala, 1979)
 Lena Horne: The Lady and Her Music (Qwest, 1981)
 A Date with Lena Horne 1944 (Sunbeam, 1981)
 The One & Only (Polydor, 1982)
 Standing Room Only (Accord, 1982)
 The Men in My Life (Three Cherries, 1988)
 Lena (Prestige, 1990)
 We'll Be Together Again (Blue Note, 1994)
 An Evening with Lena Horne (Blue Note, 1995)
 Cabin in the Sky (TCM, 1996)
 Wonderful Lena (Sovereign, 1997)
 Being Myself (Blue Note, 1998)
 The Complete Black and White Recordings (Simitar, 1999)
 The Classic Lena Horne (RCA, 2001)
 Stormy Weather (Bluebird, 2002)
 Seasons of a Life (Blue Note, 2006)

 Singles 
 "That's What Love Did to Me"/"I Take to You" (Decca)
 "Stormy Weather" (1943)
 "One for My Baby (and One More for the Road)" (1945) No. 21 U.S. Pop
 "'Deed I Do" (1948) No. 26 U.S. Pop
 "Love Me or Leave Me" (1955) No. 19 U.S. Pop
 "Now!" (1963) No. 92 U.S. Pop
 "Watch What Happens" with Gabor Szabo (1970) No. 119 U.S. Pop

 Notes 

 References 

 Bibliography 

 Gavin, James, Stormy Weather, The Life of Lena Horne, Atria, 2009. 
 Haskins, James, and Kathleen Benson, Lena, Stein and Day, 1984. 
 Horne, Lena, and Richard Schickel, Lena, Doubleday, 1965. 
 Williams, Iain Cameron Underneath a Harlem Moon: The Harlem to Paris Years of Adelaide Hall . Bloomsbury Publishers, 

 Further reading 
 Powers, Clare (June 1, 1955). "That Fabulous Lena". Down Beat. pp. 6, 20.

 External links 

 
 
 
 Entry in the New Georgia Encyclopedia 
 Biography
 Lena Horne Interview NAMM Oral History Library (1994)
 The story of her early life is retold in the radio drama "Negro Cinderella", a presentation from Destination Freedom''

1917 births
2010 deaths
20th-century American actresses
20th-century American singers
20th-century American women singers
21st-century American singers
21st-century American women singers
Activists for African-American civil rights
Actresses from New York City
African-American actresses
African-American Catholics
African-American female dancers
African-American women singers
American female dancers
American film actresses
American jazz singers
American musical theatre actresses
American people of Scotch-Irish descent
American people of Senegalese descent
American people who self-identify as being of Native American descent
American stage actresses
American television actresses
American women jazz singers
Blue Note Records artists
Dancers from New York (state)
Decca Records artists
Delta Sigma Theta members
Drama Desk Award winners
Girls' High School alumni
Grammy Award winners
Grammy Lifetime Achievement Award winners
Hollywood blacklist
Jazz musicians from New York (state)
Kennedy Center honorees
Lumet family
Metro-Goldwyn-Mayer contract players
MGM Records artists
Musicians from Brooklyn
New York (state) Democrats
Nightclub performers
People from Bedford–Stuyvesant, Brooklyn
People from St. Albans, Queens
Qwest Records artists
RCA Victor artists
Roman Catholic activists
Singers from New York City
Skye Records artists
Special Tony Award recipients
Spingarn Medal winners
Torch singers
Traditional pop music singers
United Artists Records artists
Vaudeville performers
Warner Records artists
Lena